A homer ( ḥămōr, plural חמרם ḥomārim; also  kōr) is a  biblical unit of volume used for liquids and dry goods. One homer is equal to 10 baths, or what was also equivalent to 30 seahs; each seah being the equivalent in volume to six kabs, and each kab equivalent in volume to 24 medium-sized eggs. One homer equals 220 litre or 220 dm3.

Lawrence Boadt notes the word homer comes from the Hebrew for an "ass."  "It is one ass-load."

The homer should not be confused with the omer, which is a much smaller unit of dry measure.

References

Obsolete units of measurement
Units of volume